Rodau may refer to:

 Rodau (Main), a river of Hesse, Germany
 Rodau (Wümme), a river of Lower Saxony, Germany